Zeynidin Bilalov is a Paralympian athlete from Azerbaijan competing mainly in category F11 long and triple jump events.

Bilalov has competed in three Paralympics.  In his first in 2000 where despite competing in the f11 long jump and T11 100m came away with no medals.  In the 2004 edition in Athens he again failed to medal in the T11 100m or F11 long jump he did win a silver medal in the F11 triple jump.  He repeated this medal winning feet in Beijing in the 2008 Summer Paralympics  but failed in his attempt to help Azerbaijan win a medal in the T11-13 4 × 100 m.

External links
 

Year of birth missing (living people)
Living people
Paralympic athletes of Azerbaijan
Athletes (track and field) at the 2004 Summer Paralympics
Athletes (track and field) at the 2008 Summer Paralympics
Paralympic silver medalists for Azerbaijan
Azerbaijani male sprinters
Azerbaijani male long jumpers
Azerbaijani male triple jumpers
Medalists at the 2004 Summer Paralympics
Medalists at the 2008 Summer Paralympics
Paralympic medalists in athletics (track and field)
20th-century Azerbaijani people
21st-century Azerbaijani people